The 2018 IHF Women's Junior World Championship was the 21st edition of the IHF Women's Junior World Championship that took place in Debrecen, Hungary from 1 to 14 July 2018.

Hungary won their first ever title by defeating Norway 28–22 in the final.

Qualification

Venues
Matches will be played in Debrecen.

Főnix Hall (6,500)
Hódos Imre Sports Hall (2,000)

Draw
The draw was held on 26 April 2018 at Basel, Switzerland.

Seeding

Preliminary round
All time are local (UTC+2).

Group A

Group B

Group C

Group D

President's Cup

21st place bracket

21st–23rd place semifinal

21st place game

17th place bracket

17th–20th place semifinals

19th place game

17th place game

9–16th placement games
The eight losers of the round of 16 will be seeded according to their results in the preliminary round against teams ranked 1–4.

Ranking

15th place game

13th place game

Eleventh place game

Ninth place game

Knockout stage

Bracket

5th place bracket

Round of 16

Quarterfinals

5–8th place semifinals

Semifinals

Seventh place game

Fifth place game

Third place game

Final

Final ranking

Awards
 MVP :  Song Hye-soo
 Top Goalscorer :  Helena Paulo (73 goals)

All-Star Team
 Goalkeeper :  Polina Kaplina
 Right wing :  Dorottya Faluvégi
 Right back :  Line Ellertsen
 Centre back :  Henny Reistad
 Left back :  Noémi Háfra
 Left wing :  Emma Friis
 Pivot :  Noémi Pásztor

References

External links
Official website
IHF website

2018 Women's Junior World Handball Championship
Women's Junior World Handball Championship
2018
Sport in Debrecen
Women's handball in Hungary
Junior World Handball Championship
Women's Junior World Handball Championship